The International Telecommunication Union uses an internationally agreed system for classifying radio frequency signals.  Each type of radio emission is classified according to its bandwidth, method of modulation, nature of the modulating signal, and type of information transmitted on the carrier signal. It is based on characteristics of the signal, not on the transmitter used.

An emission designation is of the form BBBB 123 45, where BBBB is the bandwidth of the signal, 1 is a letter indicating the type of modulation used of the main carrier (not including any subcarriers which is why FM stereo is F8E and not D8E), 2 is a digit representing the type of modulating signal again of the main carrier, 3 is a letter corresponding to the type of information transmitted, 4 is a letter indicating the practical details of the transmitted information, and 5 is a letter that represents the method of multiplexing.  The 4 and 5 fields are optional.

This designation system was agreed at the 1979 World Administrative Radio Conference (WARC 79), and gave rise to the Radio Regulations that came into force on 1 January 1982.  A similar designation system had been in use under prior Radio Regulations.

Designation details

Bandwidth
The bandwidth (BBBB above) is expressed as four characters: three digits and one letter. The letter occupies the position normally used for a decimal point, and indicates what unit of frequency is used to express the bandwidth. The letter H indicates Hertz, K indicates kiloHertz, M indicates megaHertz, and G indicates gigaHertz. For instance, "500H" means 500 Hz, and "2M50" means 2.5 MHz. The first character must be a digit between 1 and 9 or the letter H; it may not be the digit 0 or any other letter.

Type of modulation

Type of modulating signal

Types 4 and 5 were removed from use with the 1982 Radio Regulations.  In previous editions, they had indicated facsimile and video, respectively.

Type of transmitted information

Details of information

Multiplexing

Common examples
There is some overlap in signal types, so a transmission might legitimately be described by two or more designators. In such cases, there is usually a preferred conventional designator.

Broadcasting
A3E or A3E G  Ordinary amplitude modulation used for low frequency and medium frequency AM broadcasting

A8E, A8E H AM stereo broadcasting.

F8E, F8E H  FM broadcasting for radio transmissions on VHF, and as the audio component of analogue television transmissions. Since there are generally pilot tones (subcarriers) for stereo and RDS the designator '8' is used, to indicate multiple signals.

C3F, C3F N  Analogue PAL, SÉCAM, or NTSC television video signals (formerly type A5C, until 1982)

C7W  ATSC digital television, commonly on VHF or UHF

G7W  DVB-T, ISDB-T, or DTMB digital television, commonly on VHF or UHF

Two-way radio
A3E  AM speech communication – used for aeronautical & amateur communications

F3E  FM speech communication – often used for marine radio and many other VHF communications

20K0 F3E  Wide FM, 20.0 kHz width, ±5 kHz deviation, still widely used for Ham Radio, NOAA weather radio, marine, and aviation users and land mobile users below 50 MHz

11K2 F3E  Narrow FM, 11.25 kHz bandwidth, ±2.5 kHz deviation  – In the United States, all Part 90 Land Mobile Radio Service (LMRS) users operating above 50 MHz were required to upgrade to narrowband equipment by 1 January 2013.

6K00 F3E  Even narrower FM, future roadmap for Land Mobile Radio Service (LMRS), already required on 700 MHz public safety band

J3E  SSB speech communication, used on HF bands by marine, aeronautical and amateur users

R3E  SSB with reduced carrier (AME) speech communication, primarily used on HF bands by the military (a.k.a. compatible sideband)

Low-speed data
N0N  Continuous, unmodulated carrier, formerly common for radio direction finding (RDF) in marine and aeronautical navigation.

A1A  Signalling by keying the carrier directly, a.k.a. Continuous Wave (CW) or On-Off Keying (OOK), currently used in amateur radio. This is often but not necessarily Morse code.

A2A  Signalling by transmitting a modulated tone with a carrier, so that it can easily be heard using an ordinary AM receiver. It was formerly widely used for station identification of non-directional beacons, usually but not exclusively Morse code (an example of a modulated continuous wave, as opposed to A1A, above).

F1B  Frequency-shift keying (FSK) telegraphy, such as RTTY.

F1C  High frequency Radiofax

F2D  Data transmission by frequency modulation of a radio frequency carrier with an audio frequency FSK subcarrier. Often called AFSK/FM.

J2B  Phase-shift keying such as PSK31 (BPSK31)

Other
P0N  Unmodulated Pulse-Doppler radar

Notes

The emission designator for QAM is D7W.  The D7W comes from Paragraph 42 of the FCC's July 10, 1996, Digital Declaratory Order allowing then ITFS/MMDS stations to use 64QAM digital instead of NTSC analog.
The emission designator for COFDM is W7D.  The W7D comes from Paragraph 40 of the November 13, 2002, ET Docket 01-75 R&O.
It is only coincidence that the QAM and COFDM emission designators are reciprocals.

References

Further reading
 
 Radio Regulations, ITU, Geneva, 1982
 Radio Regulations, 2004, ITU Geneva, 2004, c.f. Volume 2 - Appendices, Appendix 1
 Radiocommunications Vocabulary, Recommendation ITU-R V.573-4, ITU-R, Geneva, 2000
 Determination of Necessary Bandwidths Including Examples for their Calculation, Recommendation ITU-R SM.1138, Geneva, 1995
 Emission characteristics of radio transmissions, Australian Communications Authority, Canberra
 Notes Regarding Designation of Emission, Industry Canada, 1982
 Eckersley, R.J. Amateur Radio Operating Manual, 3rd edition, Radio Society of Great Britain, 1985, 

Radio modulation modes
Radio communications